Marcus C. Smith (April 11, 1825 – January 26, 1900) was a Republican politician and third mayor of Muncie, Indiana. He is buried in Beech Grove Cemetery. He also was a state representative and state senator for Indiana.

He was a resident of Yorktown from 1847 to 1859.

References

1825 births
1900 deaths
Mayors of Muncie, Indiana
People from Connersville, Indiana
Republican Party members of the Indiana House of Representatives
Republican Party Indiana state senators
19th-century American politicians